Anthony Nigro is an American singer-songwriter. He is a founding member of Osgoods, the rock band formed in Tucson, Arizona with school-mate and drummer Colin Wyatt. In 1998, Nigro relocated to Los Angeles.

Discography with Osgoods
 Automatic Do-Over (2003, re-released 2008)
 Smother and Shrink (2006)

References

External links
 

Date of birth missing (living people)
Living people
American male guitarists
American singer-songwriters
Guitarists from Arizona
Year of birth missing (living people)
American male singer-songwriters